Gemeinhardt Co. is a manufacturer of flutes and piccolos.  These musical instruments are developed by this company for all levels of musicians, beginners to professionals. It is owned by its major supplier, Angel Industries Co. Ltd of Taiwan, widely acknowledged as the premier manufacturer of woodwind musical instruments.  The Gemeinhardt Company is headquartered in Elkhart, Indiana, where many of its instruments are still made.

Ownership
From 1993 to 2011, Gemeinhardt was owned by investment bankers under the corporate name Gemstone Musical Instruments.  In June 2011 Gemeinhardt was acquired by Angel Industries Co. Ltd. of Taiwan, a manufacturer of instruments and business partner of Gemeinhardt for several years. David Pirtle, president and CEO of Gemeinhardt, said that the acquisition by Angel Industries would allow Gemeinhardt more freedom to make decisions and run production in order to best serve the market.

While many musical instrument brands are made overseas, the partnership between Gemeinhardt and Angel Industries is unique. Gemeinhardt manufactures the flute components (headjoint, body, footjoint, keys) in Elkhart, Indiana USA then sends them to Angel Industries to assemble them.  They are then returned to Elkhart, Indiana for testing and adjusting in the Gemeinhardt workshop. David Pirtle, president and CEO of Gemeinhardt, asserted that this is because the parts can be made better in the Gemeinhardt workshop in America. This differs from most brands, which have their flute components manufactured overseas.

History
Kurt Gemeinhardt was brought to the United States from Markneukirchen, Germany, by George Bundy of Selmer USA company, which had recently relocated to Elkhart, Indiana.  Working with Philip H. Marcil in the Selmer flute division, they copied the typical Louis Lot metal flute design for its flutes.

Founded by Kurt Gemeinhardt, a 4th generation flute-maker in Germany, the Gemeinhardt company was established in 1948, 20 years after Gemeinhardt’s immigration to the United States.  Initially crafting only very fine hand made flutes for professionals, the company expanded in 1952, moving to Elkhart Indiana to produce all levels of silver flutes.  Beginner student flutes were developed at this time as well.  It was these flutes that eventually became the bread and butter of the corporation as Gemeinhardt’s reputation for fine beginner flutes became a hallmark of the industry.

Kurt's father had studied under Emil Rittershausen, who had been trained by Theobald Boehm, and so the instruments the company produces can trace its lineage back to the creator of the Boehm system.

The Gemeinhardt Company is very popular in the music field, although it hasn't always followed the mainstream.  In the mid 1970s Albert Cooper modified the placement of toneholes on the flute so that it would match the common tuning of A at 440 Hz.  Before this many flutes were still designed with an older A435Hz tone hole placement (scale), despite being designed to play at A440Hz through the use of a shortened headjoint.  Many flute companies recognized this change and therefore his scale and decided to make their flutes in the same way, but the Gemeinhardt Company was slow to modify its design. This in turn makes notes played in the higher register on an old Gemeinhardt flute sharp and the lower register flat, which can cause issues for beginner flutists if they are playing an old Gemeinhardt (pre-21st century), but with practice they can learn to play the flute so that the notes are correct.  Otherwise, they may consider buying a newer Gemeinhardt flute.

However, the design of Gemeinhardt's flutes have changed often since then and have been updated and redesigned accordingly.

In 2014 the Gemeinhardt Company introduced a new line of flutes named the Kurt Gemeinhardt Generation Series at the National Flute Association's annual convention in Chicago.  Consisting of entirely American-made conservatory and professional flutes, this line was developed by Tom Lacy and Dave Siekman.  These flutes utilize the RS2012 Scale invented by famous flutists Trevor Wye, William Bennett, and Eldred Spell. This scale design is claimed to be the most accurate on the market.

In 1997, Gemeinhardt acquired the Roy Seaman Piccolo Company.

In addition to flutes and piccolos, Gemeinhardt also has a line of saxophones and clarinets.

Products

Flutes
The Gemeinhardt company sells its flutes in different categories: Student, Conservatory, Professional, Kurt Gemeinhardt Generation Series (American-made conservatory and professional flutes), Alto flutes, and Bass Flutes. It also sells headjoints separately. All flutes are available with an offset G (noted by O in the model number).

Gemeinhardt models
Student Flutes: Model 1SP Flute / Model 2SP Flute / Model 2BLK Flute 
Conservatory Flutes: Model 2SH Flute / Model 3B Flute  / Model 3SHB Flute /  Model 3SB Flute
Professional Flutes: Model 33SHB Flute / Model 33SB Flute / Model 33SSB Flute / Ali Ryerson Autograph Series Flute
Kurt Gemeinhardt Generation Series Flutes: The "Blue" Model Flute /  The "White" Model Flute  /  The "Red" Model Flute  /  The "Revolution" Model Flute
Alto Flutes: Model 11A-BLK Alto Flute  /  Model 11A Alto Flute / Model 11ASH Alto Flute / Ali Ryerson Artists' Series BLK Alto Flute  /  Model 11AS Alto Flute 
Bass Flutes: Model 21BSP Bass Flute  /  Model 21B-BLK Bass Flute
Headjoints: Model J1 headjoint / Model NG1 headjoint / Model NG2 headjoint

Piccolos
All Gemeinhardt and Roy Seaman Piccolos are made in the USA, except the 1P Piccolo

The Gemeinhardt company also sells piccolos under several categories, which are composed of composite, silver, wood, and the Roy Seaman brand. The composite piccolo is made out of a synthetic material with some wooden texture to it, metal piccolos can be silver-plated or solid silver, wood piccolos are made of grenadilla wood and are rarely used outside because the wood can crack, and finally the Roy Seaman Piccolo sub-brand of conservatory and professional piccolos.

Gemeinhardt Piccolo models 
Composite Piccolos - used for outside (Marching Band) and inside (Concert Band/Orchestra): Model 1P Piccolo  /  Model 4P Piccolo / Model 4PMH Piccolo / Model 4PSH Piccolo
Metal Piccolos - used for mainly outside (Marching Band): Model 4SP Piccolo /  Model "Stinger" Piccolo  / Model 4SH Piccolo / Model 4S Piccolo / Model 4SS Piccolo
Wood Piccolos - used mainly for inside (Concert Band/Orchestra): Model 4W Piccolo / Model 4WSSK Piccolo / Model KG Limited Piccolo
Roy Seaman Piccolos: Model "Storm" Piccolo  /  Model "Storm BLK" Piccolo  /  Model RS Standard Piccolo  /  Model RS Limited Piccolo

Saxophones
Student models: Model GSA500 LQ Alto saxophone / Model GSA600 LQ Alto saxophone / Model GST500 LQ Alto saxophone / Model GST600 LQ Alto saxophone

Clarinets
Student models: Model 2CN1 Clarinet / Model 2CS1 Clarinet

References

External links
 Gemeinhardt Website
 Gemstone Website
 Venture Magazine article on Gemstone
 Business Week
 Band Director

Musical instrument manufacturing companies of the United States
Musical instrument manufacturing companies of Taiwan
Companies based in Elkhart County, Indiana
Flute makers
American brands
American subsidiaries of foreign companies